Addae is both a given name and a surname. Notable people with the name include:

Addae Kyenkyehene, Ghanaian footballer
Bright Addae (born 1992), Ghanaian footballer
Christopher Addae (born 1963), Ghanaian politician
Jahleel Addae (born 1990), American football player
Kwodwo Addae (born 1995), Ghanaian footballer